Kunturiri (Aymara kunturi condor, -(i)ri a suffix, Hispanicized spelling Condoriri) is a  mountain in the Bolivian Andes. It is situated west of Potosí in the Potosí Department, Tomás Frías Province, Yocalla Municipality. Kunturiri lies north-west of the lower mountain Inka Qhata (Aymara for "Inca knee pit", Quechua for "Inca slope", Inca Khata).

References 

Mountains of Potosí Department